Kankick (also spelled as Kan Kick, real name Ted Hughes) is an American hip-hop producer from Oxnard, Los Angeles.

Career

Kan Kick grew up in the city of Oxnard, along with several fellow hip-hop musicians including Madlib, Oh No, DJ Romes and Dudley Perkins. In the early 1990s he was an integral part of Lootpack, appearing on several of their tracks. He has also produced some of The Alkaholiks' early tracks. Later he went on to produce a number of solo instrumental albums, as well as collaborate with several rappers and producers such as Planet Asia, Declaime and DJ Babu. His 2001 release, From Artz Unknown was his first official solo introduction and featured West Coast rappers such as Declaime, The Visionaries, Krondon, Phil Da Agony, Planet Asia, and Wildchild.

Discography

2001: From Artz Unknown
2004: Acid Massive Musical
2004: The Traditional Heritage
2005: Seeing Spirits
2006: Serious Business This!
2008: Kan Kick Remixes
2009: Beautiful: Opus of Love, Deeper than Flesh
2011: Rummage to Royalty

References

Living people
American hip hop record producers
Date of birth missing (living people)
Year of birth missing (living people)